Mark Smith is the author of several fantasy gamebooks.

Background
Smith is of Czech-Hungarian/English descent, born in Birmingham Smith was educated in Brighton and went on to gain an MA in Experimental Psychology from Oxford University and spent some time racing in Formula Renault.

Career
Mark Smith is an author of gamebooks, including co-authoring two Fighting Fantasy titles (Talisman of Death and Sword of the Samurai), and the series Duel Master, Falcon and Way of the Tiger (1985-1987), all of which he co-authored with Jamie Thomson, whom he met whilst at school in Brighton. 

Today, Smith remains in southeast England, having been made insolvent by HMRC in December 2020.

List of works
Fighting Fantasy #11: Talisman of Death
Fighting Fantasy #20: Sword of the Samurai
Falcon
The Renegade Lord
Mechanon
The Rack of Baal
Lost in Time
The Dying Sun
At the End of Time
The Way of the Tiger
Avenger!
Assassin!
Usurper!
Overlord!
Warbringer!
Inferno!
Duel Master
Challenge of the Magi
Blood Valley
The Shattered Realm
Arena of Death
Virtual Reality #1: Green Blood
Virtual Reality #3: The Coils of Hate

References

20th-century births
Year of birth missing (living people)
Living people
Alumni of the University of Oxford
British fantasy writers
Fighting Fantasy